Heureta is a genus of moths in the family Cosmopterigidae.

Species
Heureta cirrhodora (Meyrick, 1915)

References
Natural History Museum Lepidoptera genus database

Cosmopteriginae